Lansing is an unincorporated community in DeSoto County, Florida, United States, located approximately  northwest of Arcadia.

Geography

References

Unincorporated communities in DeSoto County, Florida
Unincorporated communities in Florida